A ganglion cyst is a fluid-filled bump associated with a joint or tendon sheath. It most often occurs at the back of the wrist, followed by the front of the wrist. Onset is often over several months, typically with no further symptoms. Occasionally, pain or numbness may occur. Complications may include carpal tunnel syndrome.

The cause is unknown. The underlying mechanism is believed to involve an outpouching of the synovial membrane. Risk factors include gymnastics activity. Diagnosis is typically based on examination with light shining through the lesion being supportive. Medical imaging may be done to rule out other potential causes.

Treatment options include watchful waiting, splinting the affected joint, needle aspiration, or surgery. About half the time, they resolve on their own. About three per 10,000 people newly develop ganglion of the wrist or hand a year. They most commonly occur in young and middle-aged females.

Presentation
The average size of these cysts is 2.0 cm, but excised cysts of more than 5 cm have been reported. The size of the cyst may vary over time and may increase after activity. Between 50 and 70% of all masses on the hand and wrist are expected to be ganglion cysts.

Sites
Ganglion cysts most frequently occur around the dorsum of the wrist and on the fingers. A common site of the occurrence is along the extensor carpi radialis brevis, as it passes over the dorsum of the wrist joint. Although most commonly found in the wrist, ganglion cysts also may occur in the foot.

Ganglion cysts are "commonly observed in association with the joints and tendons of the appendicular skeleton, with 88% 'in communication with the multiple small joints of the hand and wrist' and 11% with those of the foot and ankle".

Wrist 
They commonly are found near the wrist joint, especially at the scapholunate area.

Common wrist ganglions include:

 dorsal wrist ganglion
 volar wrist ganglion
 volar retinaculum ganglion
 extensor retinaculum ganglion
 occult ganglion
 intraosseous ganglion
 mucous cyst

Foot 
In a 2007 study of patients in Glasgow whose foot lumps were removed surgically, 39 of 101 cases were ganglion cysts. The study replicated earlier findings that no ganglion cysts were found on the sole or heel. The authors wrote, "Although lumps in these areas may be ganglia, the surgeon should probably consider other diagnoses in the first instance." The researchers noted a preponderance of occurrence among females (85%) and that 11 of the other cases had been misdiagnosed as ganglion cysts before surgery.

Ganglion cysts are not limited to the hands and feet. They may occur near the knee, commonly near the cruciate ligaments, but they may occur at the origins of the gastrocnemius tendon, and anteriorly on Hoffa's infrapatellar fat pad. At the shoulder, they typically occur at the acromioclavicular joint or along the biceps tendon.

Other 
From their common origin at a joint or tendon, ganglion cysts may form in a wide range of locations. Rarely, intraosseous ganglion cysts occur, sometimes in combination with a cyst in the overlying soft tissue. Rare cases of intramuscular ganglion cysts in the gastrocnemius muscle of the calf have been reported. It is possible for a cyst to be considerably displaced from the joint. In one extreme case, a ganglion cyst was observed to propagate extensively via the conduit of the common peroneal nerve sheath to a location in the thigh; in such cases surgery to the proximal joint to remove the articular connection may remove the need for a riskier, more extensive surgery in the neural tissue of the thigh. The cysts may intrude into the spine, which may cause pain and dysesthesia in distant extremities.

Cystic adventitial disease, in which a cyst occurs within the popliteal artery near the knee, has been proposed recently to occur by an articular mechanism, with a conduit leading from the joint, similar to the development of ganglion cysts, that spreads within the peroneal nerve.

Cysts that were compressing one or more nerves and causing bone erosions have been reported to occur near the shoulder joint.

Causes
The most commonly accepted probable cause of ganglion cysts is the herniation hypothesis, by which they are thought to occur as an out-pouching or distention of a weakened portion of a joint capsule or tendon sheath. This description is based on the observations that the cysts occur close to tendons and joints.  The microscopic anatomy of the cyst resembles that of tenosynovial tissue. The fluid is similar in composition to synovial fluid. Dye injected into the joint capsule frequently ends up in the cyst, which may become enlarged after activity. Dye injected into the cyst rarely enters the joint, however, which has been attributed to the apparent formation of an effective and one-way "check valve", allowing fluid out of the joint, but not back in.

In synovials, post-traumatic degeneration of connective tissue and inflammation have been considered as causes. Other possible mechanisms for the development of ganglion cysts include repeated mechanical stress, facet arthrosis, myxoid degeneration of periarticular fibrous tissues and liquefaction with chronic damage, increased production of hyaluronic acid by fibroblasts, and a proliferation of mesenchymal cells.

Diagnosis

Ganglion cysts are diagnosed easily, as they are visible and pliable to touch.

Radiographs in anteroposterior and lateral views should be obtained to exclude any more serious underlying pathology. Ultrasonography (US) may be used to increase diagnostic confidence in clinically suspected lesions or to depict occult cysts, because intratendinous ganglia are readily distinguished from extratendinous ganglia during dynamic ultrasonography, as microscopically, ganglionic cysts are thin-walled cysts containing clear, mucinous fluid.

Treatment
If persons are not in pain, they should simply be reassured that the lump is not cancerous, and wait for the lump to disappear on its own. At least 33% resolve without treatment within six years, and 50% within 10 years.

Surgical treatments remain the primary elective option for treatment of ganglion cysts. The progression of ganglion surgery worldwide is to use an arthroscopic or miniopening method. Alternatively, a hypodermic needle may be used to drain the fluid from the cyst (via aspiration) and a corticosteroid may be injected after the cyst is empty; however, if the fluid has thickened, owing to the passage of time, this treatment is not always effective. The recurrence rate is about 50% following needle drainage (via aspiration) of ganglion cysts.

A historical method of treatment for a ganglion cyst was to strike the lump with a large and heavy book, causing the cyst to rupture and drain into the surrounding tissues. Historically, a Bible was the largest or only book in any given household, and was employed for this treatment. This led to the  nickname of "Bible bumps" or "Gideon's disease" for these cysts. This treatment risks injuring the person and thus is not recommended.

Complications
Complications of treatment may include joint stiffness and scar formation. Recurrence of the lesion is more common following excision of a volar ganglion cyst in the wrist. Incomplete excision that fails to include the stalk or pedicle also may lead to recurrence, as will failing to execute a layered closure of the incision.

Prognosis
Recurrence rate is higher in aspirated cysts than in excised ones. Ganglion cysts have been found to recur following surgery in 12% to 41% of patients.

A six-year outcome study of the treatment of ganglion cysts on the dorsal wrist compared excision, aspiration, and no treatment. Neither excision nor aspiration provided long-term benefit better than no treatment. Of the untreated ganglion cysts, 58% resolved spontaneously; the postsurgery recurrence rate in this study was 39%. A similar study in 2003 of ganglion cysts occurring on the palmar surface of the wrist states: "At 2- and 5-year follow-up, regardless of treatment, no difference in symptoms was found, regardless of whether the palmar wrist ganglion was excised, aspirated, or left alone."

Etymology
Being a misnomer that has persisted into modern times, the ganglion cyst is unrelated to the neural "ganglion" or "ganglion cell"; its etymology traces back to the ancient Greek γάγγλιον, a "knot" or "swelling beneath the skin", which extends to the neural masses by analogy. Generally, Hippocrates is credited with the description of these cysts.

The term "Bible cyst" (or "Bible bump") is derived from an urban legend or historical effort to hit the cyst with a Bible. Trying to treat the lesion by hitting it with a book, though, is discouraged.

See also
 Ganglioneuroma

References

External links 

American Academy of Orthopaedic Surgeons - Ganglions cyst of the wrist
Canadian Centre for Occupational Health and Safety - Ganglion cyst

Dermal and subcutaneous growths
Wikipedia medicine articles ready to translate
Wikipedia emergency medicine articles ready to translate